Thornton Stadium is a greyhound racing track in Thornton, Kirkcaldy, Fife, Scotland. The track is independent and is therefore not regulated by the Greyhound Board of Great Britain. Racing takes place on most Saturdays at 7.30pm.

Location
the stadium is between Kirkcaldy and Glenrothes is the village of Thornton and Thornton Stadium is located on a road known as Ore Mill off Main Street and is situated near the A92.

History
The first race was held on 29 May 1936  and the circuit is described as a good galloping track. In 1977, Ricky Grant took over the ownership of the track and added floodlights and refurbished the site. He put the six acre stadium on the market in April 1998 asking £200,000 for it.

Races are held over 100, 300, 500 and 680 yards (mainly handicaps). It is one of only two independent (unaffiliated to a governing body) tracks remaining today with racing taking place on most Saturdays at 7.30pm.

Track records
Current

References

Greyhound racing in Scotland
Sports venues in Scotland
Sports venues in Fife
1936 establishments in Scotland
Greyhound racing venues in the United Kingdom